Lir-e Bozorg (also Romanized as Līr-e Bozorg) is a village in Tayebi-ye Garmsiri-ye Jonubi Rural District, in the Central District of Kohgiluyeh County, Kohgiluyeh and Boyer-Ahmad Province, Iran. At the 2006 census, its population was 176, in 37 families.

References 

Populated places in Kohgiluyeh County